Səfərli or Safarly may refer to:
 Səfərli, Agdam, Azerbaijan
 Səfərli, Tovuz, Azerbaijan
 Eltaj Safarli (born 1992), Azerbaijani chess Grandmaster